Dmitri Sergeyevich Kamenshchikov (born 27 August 1998) is a Russian football player. He plays for FC SKA Rostov-on-Don.

Club career
He played his first game for the main squad of FC Rubin Kazan on 24 September 2015 in a Russian Cup game against FC SKA-Energiya Khabarovsk which his team lost 0–2.

He made his Russian Football National League debut for FC Khimki on 7 July 2019 in a game against FC Luch Vladivostok and scored on his debut.

References

External links
 
 

1998 births
People from Naberezhnye Chelny
Living people
Russian footballers
Association football forwards
Russia youth international footballers
FC Rubin Kazan players
FC Neftekhimik Nizhnekamsk players
FC KAMAZ Naberezhnye Chelny players
FC Khimki players
FC Tom Tomsk players
FC Tekstilshchik Ivanovo players
FC SKA Rostov-on-Don players
Sportspeople from Tatarstan